The 1907 Home Nations Championship was the twenty-fifth series of the rugby union Home Nations Championship. Six matches were played between 12 January and 16 March. It was contested by England, Ireland, Scotland and Wales.

Although not officially part of the tournament until 1910, a match were arranged with the French national team which was played during the Championship against England. This was a repeat of England's first encounter with France which had been played during the 1905/06 season, but on this occasion hosting France on British soil for the first time in the national team's history.

Table

Results

Additional matches outside the Championship

Scoring system
The matches for this season were decided on points scored. A try was worth three points, while converting a kicked goal from the try gave an additional two points. A dropped goal was worth four points, while a goal from mark and penalty goals were worth three points.

The matches

Wales vs. England

Wales: Bailey Davies (Llanelli), Johnnie Williams (Cardiff), John Hart Evans (Pontypool), Rhys Gabe (Cardiff), Hopkin Maddock (London Welsh), Reggie Gibbs (Cardiff), Billy Trew (Swansea), Dicky Owen (Swansea) capt., James Watts (Llanelli), George Travers (Pill Harriers), Charlie Pritchard (Newport), John Alf Brown (Cardiff), Billy O'Neill (Cardiff), Tom Evans (Llanelli), William Dowell (Newport)

England: John Jackett (Leicester), SF Coopper (Blackheath), JGG Birkett (Harlequins), HE Shewring (Bristol), FS Scott (Bristol), AD Stoop (Harlequins), RA Jago (Devonport Albion), CH Shaw (Moseley), Basil Hill (Blackheath) Capt., J Green (Skipton), TS Kelly (Exeter), LAN Slocock (Liverpool), WA Mills (Devonport Albion), WMB Nanson (Carlisle), John Hopley (Blackheath)

Scotland vs. Wales

Scotland: T Sloan (Glasgow Acads), MW Walter (London Scottish), DG McGregor (Pontypridd), KG MacLeod (Cambridge University), ABHL Purves (London Scottish), LL Greig (US Portsmouth) capt., ED Simson (London Scottish), IC Geddes (London Scottish), GA Sanderson (Royal HSFP), GM Frew (Glasgow HSFP), JC MacCallum (Watsonians), LM Speirs (Watsonians), WP Scott (West of Scotland), Bedell-Sivright (Edinburgh University), HG Monteith (Cambridge University)

Wales: Bert Winfield (Cardiff), Johnnie Williams (Cardiff), John Hart Evans (Pontypool), Rhys Gabe (Cardiff), Hopkin Maddock (London Welsh), Reggie Gibbs (Cardiff), Dicky Owen (Swansea), Billy Trew (Swansea) capt., James Watts (Llanelli), George Travers (Pill Harriers), Charlie Pritchard (Newport), John Alf Brown (Cardiff), Jim Webb (Abertillery), Tom Evans (Llanelli), William Dowell (Newport)

Ireland vs. England

Ireland: C Thompson (NIFC), TJ Greeves (NIFC), Basil Maclear (Monkstown), James Cecil Parke (Dublin University), HB Thrift (Dublin University), TTH Robinson (Wanderers), ED Caddell (Wanderers), RE Forbes (Malone), M White (Queens's College, Cork), W St J Coogan (Queens's College, Cork), A Tedford (Malone) capt., HG Wilson (Malone), JA Sweeney (Blackrock College), JJ Coffey (Lansdowne), GT Hamlet (Old Wesley)

England: John Jackett (Leicester), HM Imrie (Durham City), AS Pickering (Harrogate), WC Wilson (Richmond), HE Shewring (Bristol), RA Jago (Devonport Albion), J Peters (Plymouth), CH Shaw (Moseley), SG Williams (Devonport Albion), J Green (Skipton) capt., TS Kelly (Exeter), LAN Slocock (Liverpool), WA Mills (Devonport Albion), G Leather (Liverpool), Jumbo Milton (Camborne School of Mines)

Scotland vs. Ireland

Scotland: DG Schulze (London Scottish), MW Walter (London Scottish), DG McGregor (Pontypridd), KG MacLeod (Cambridge University), ABHL Purves (London Scottish), P Munro (London Scottish) capt., ED Simson (London Scottish), IC Geddes (London Scottish), GA Sanderson (Royal HSFP), GM Frew (Glasgow HSFP), JC MacCallum (Watsonians), LM Speirs (Watsonians), WP Scott (West of Scotland), Bedell-Sivright (Edinburgh University), HG Monteith (Cambridge University)

Ireland: C Thompson (NIFC), TJ Greeves (NIFC), Basil Maclear (Monkstown), James Cecil Parke (Dublin University), HB Thrift (Dublin University), TTH Robinson (Wanderers), ED Caddell (Wanderers), CE Allen (Derry) capt., HS Sugars (Royal HSFP), W St J Coogan (Queens's College, Cork), A Tedford (Malone), HG Wilson (Malone), JA Sweeney (Blackrock College), F Gardiner (NIFC), GT Hamlet (Old Wesley)

Wales vs. Ireland

Wales: Bert Winfield (Cardiff), Johnnie Williams (Cardiff), John Hart Evans (Pontypool), Rhys Gabe (Cardiff) capt., David Phillips Jones (Pontypool), Percy Bush (Cardiff), Dickie David (Cardiff), James Watts (Llanelli), George Travers (Pill Harriers), Charlie Pritchard (Newport), John Alf Brown (Cardiff), Billy O'Neill (Cardiff), Tom Evans (Llanelli), William Dowell (Newport), Arthur Harding (Swansea)

Ireland: WP Hinton (Old Wesley), TJ Greeves (NIFC), Basil Maclear (Monkstown), James Cecil Parke (Dublin University), HB Thrift (Dublin University), TTH Robinson (Wanderers), FMW Harvey (Wanderers), CE Allen (Derry) capt., M White (Queens's College, Cork), HJ Knox (Lansdowne), A Tedford (Malone), HG Wilson (Malone), JA Sweeney (Blackrock College), F Gardiner (NIFC), GT Hamlet (Old Wesley)

England vs. Scotland

England: John Jackett (Leicester), AW Newton (Blackheath), JGG Birkett (Harlequins), WC Wilson (Richmond), HE Shewring (Bristol), SP Start (United Services), J Peters (Plymouth), CH Shaw (Moseley), GD Roberts (Harlequins), J Green (Skipton), TS Kelly (Exeter), LAN Slocock (Liverpool), WA Mills (Devonport Albion), EW Roberts (RNE College) capt., SG Williams (Devonport Albion)

Scotland: DG Schulze (London Scottish), T Sloan (Glasgow Acads), DG McGregor (Pontypridd), KG MacLeod (Cambridge University), ABHL Purves (London Scottish), P Munro (London Scottish) capt., ED Simson (London Scottish), IC Geddes (London Scottish), GA Sanderson (Royal HSFP), GM Frew (Glasgow HSFP), JC MacCallum (Watsonians), LM Speirs (Watsonians), WP Scott (West of Scotland), Bedell-Sivright (Edinburgh University), JMB Scott (Edinburgh Acads.)

French matches

England vs. France

England: H Lee (Blackheath), TB Batchelor (Oxford University), JGG Birkett (Harlequins), D Lambert (Harlequins), HE Shewring (Bristol), TG Wedge (St. Ives), AD Stoop (Harlequins), CH Shaw (Moseley), Basil Hill (Blackheath) capt., J Green (Skipton), TS Kelly (Exeter), LAN Slocock (Liverpool), WA Mills (Devonport Albion), WMB Nanson (Carlisle), John Hopley (Blackheath)

France: H Issac (Racing Club de France), C Varseilles (Stade Français), P Maclos (Stade Français), H Martin (Stade Bordelais Universitaire), Gaston Lane (Racing Club de France), A Hubert (Association Sportive Français), A Lacassagne (Stade Bordelais Universitaire), A Verges (Stade Français), H Poirier (Universite de France), P Mauriat (Lyon), Marc Giacardy (Stade Bordelais Universitaire), AH Muhr (Racing Club de France), Marcel Communeau (Stade Français) capt., C Beaurin (Stade Français), J Dufourcq (Stade Bordelais Universitaire)

External links

Bibliography
 
 

1905-06
1906–07 in British rugby union
1906–07 in English rugby union
1906–07 in Irish rugby union
1906–07 in Scottish rugby union
1906–07 in Welsh rugby union
Home Nations Championship
Home Nations Championship
Home Nations Championship